Meszah Peak is a volcanic cone located  north of Telegraph Creek and  southwest of Zus Mountain in British Columbia, Canada. It is the highest peak of the Level Mountain Range, a cluster of bare peaks on the summit of the massive Level Mountain shield volcano, which forms the most voluminous and most persistent eruptive centre in the Northern Cordilleran Volcanic Province.

See also
 List of volcanoes in Canada
 List of Northern Cordilleran volcanoes
 Volcanology of Western Canada
 Geography of British Columbia
 Geology of the Pacific Northwest
 Heart Peaks
 Atsutla Range

References
 
 Catalogue of Canadian volcanoes: Meszah Peak

External links

 Meszah Peak in the Canadian Mountain Encyclopedia

Volcanoes of British Columbia
Two-thousanders of British Columbia
Level Mountain
Cassiar Country
Pleistocene volcanoes